Tom or Thomas Simmons may refer to:

 Tom Simmons (comedian), American stand-up comedian
 Tom Simmons (footballer) (1929–2013), Australian rules footballer
 Thomas Joseph Simmons (1932-2002), American lawyer and politician
 Thomas J. Simmons (1837–1905), American justice in the state of Georgia
 Tom Simmons (comics)

See also
 Thomas Simons (disambiguation)